Gnathophis musteliceps is an eel in the family Congridae (conger/garden eels). It was described by Alfred William Alcock in 1894, originally under the genus Congromuraena. It is a marine, deep water-dwelling eel which is known from the Bay of Bengal, in the western Indian Ocean. It dwells at a depth range of 265–457 metres.

References

musteliceps
Fish described in 1894